Jefferson B. Glick (November 23, 1906 – July 31, 1985) was an American bridge player.

Glick was from North Miami Beach, Florida.

Bridge accomplishments

Wins

 North American Bridge Championships (9)
 Hilliard Mixed Pairs (1) 1941 
 Spingold (1) 1934 
 Marcus Cup (1) 1951 
 Mitchell Board-a-Match Teams (4) 1947, 1948, 1954, 1958 
 Reisinger (1) 1940 
 Spingold (1) 1949

Runners-up

 North American Bridge Championships
 Masters Team of 4 (1) 1934 
 Reisinger (2) 1949, 1952 
 Spingold (2) 1946, 1952

Notes

1906 births
1985 deaths
People from Cleveland
American contract bridge players
People from North Miami Beach, Florida